Stefano Ballo (born 18 February 1993) is an Italian swimmer. He competed in the men's 200 metre freestyle at the 2020 Summer Olympics.

References

External links
 

1993 births
Living people
Italian male swimmers
Italian male freestyle swimmers
Olympic swimmers of Italy
Swimmers at the 2020 Summer Olympics
Sportspeople from Bolzano
European Aquatics Championships medalists in swimming
21st-century Italian people